Distichona is a genus of flies in the family Tachinidae.

Species
D. autumnalis (Townsend, 1909)
D. georgiae (Brauer & Bergenstamm, 1891)
D. kansensis (Townsend, 1892)

References

Diptera of North America
Exoristinae
Tachinidae genera
Taxa named by Frederik Maurits van der Wulp